Hisila Yami (born 25 June 1959), also known by her nom de guerre Parvati, is a Nepalese politician and architect. She is a deputy chairman of Socialist Party of Nepal and a former president of the All Nepal Women's Association (Revolutionary).

Early life and education 
Her father Dharma Ratna Yami was a Nepalese social activist, author and government deputy minister.

Yami graduated from the School of Planning and Architecture in Delhi, India, in 1982. She completed her M. Arch. from the University of Newcastle upon Tyne, UK in 1995.

Activism 
During the 1990 uprising against the panchayat regime, Yami was one of the most high-profile women leaders in the protests. She was also the General Secretary of All India Nepalese Students' Association, 1981–1982. She was a lecturer at Institute of Engineering, Pulchowk Campus from 1983 to 1996. In 1995 she became the President of the All Nepal Women's Association (Revolutionary) and served a two-year term. She went underground in 1996 after the inception of the Communist Party of Nepal (Maoist) led People's War. Since 2001, she has been a Central Committee Member of CPN (Maoist) and has worked in departments such as the International Department of the organization.

Political career 
She made her first public appearance on 18 June 2003, during the then ongoing peace negotiations between the government and the Maoists.

In early 2005 she was, along with Bhattarai and Dina Nath Sharma, demoted by the party leadership. In July she was reinstated into the Central Committee.

On 1 April 2007 Hisila Yami joined the interim government of Nepal as Minister of Physical Planning and Works. Following a Maoist boycott of the government from September to December 2007, Yami was again sworn in as Minister of Physical Planning on 31 December 2007. Following her victory in the Constituent Assembly elections, 2008, from Kathmandu constituency no. 7, she became a member of the Constituent Assembly. She joined the CPN (Maoist) led government in September as Minister for Tourism and Civil Aviation.

In 2015, Yami and Bhattarai split from CPN (Maoist). In 2016, they founded Naya Shakti Party. On May 9, 2019, Naya Shakti, united with Federal Socialist Forum to found Samajbadi Party, Nepal. Later, Samajbadi Party united with Rastriya Janata Party to form Janata Samajbadi Party. As for 2020, Yami is part of Janata Samajbadi Party.

Personal life 

Yami is married to fellow Maoist leader Baburam Bhattarai. They have a daughter. [[File:Hisila Yami.jpg|thumb|right|265px|Hisila Yami being interviewed by AP]]
Bibliography
 Adha Akash Adha Dharti, ed. by Hisila Yami, Sita Sharma, Durga Neupane, Prerana Mahila Parivar, 1991
 Adhikar: Demystification of Law for Nepali Women, Hisila Yami, Sandhya Basnet Bhatta, Tulsi Bhatta, Prerana Mahila Parivar, 1993
 Yami, Hisila and Bhattarai, Baburam, Marxbad ra mahila mukti. Kathmandu: Utprerak Prakashan, 2000.
 Hisila Yami (comrade Parvati) People's War and Women's Liberation in Nepal – Purvaiya Prakashan, Raipur, Chhattishgarth, India 2006 – Second Edition, Janadhwani Publication, 2007
 Hisila: from Revolutionary to First Lady'' - India Penguin, 2021

See also
 Socialist Party of Nepal

References

External links
 People’s Power in Nepal – Article in Monthly Review by Yami
 Turkish version of the article
 Comments by Yami in Monthly Review 
 Women's Participation in People's War in Nepal
 NPR Interview with Comrade Parvati
 http://nepalimahila.com/profile_hishila_yami.html

1959 births
Living people
Tourism ministers of Nepal
Nepalese architects
Nepalese women architects
21st-century Nepalese women politicians
21st-century Nepalese politicians
Nepalese atheists
Communist Party of Nepal (Maoist Centre) politicians
People from Gorkha District
Delhi University alumni
School of Planning and Architecture, New Delhi alumni
People of the Nepalese Civil War
Spouses of prime ministers of Nepal
Female revolutionaries
Newar people
Nepalese memoirists
20th-century Nepalese women politicians
20th-century Nepalese politicians
Members of the 1st Nepalese Constituent Assembly
Socialist Party of Nepal politicians